Oil Search was the largest oil and gas exploration and development company incorporated in Papua New Guinea, which operates all of Papua New Guinea's oilfields. In December 2021, it merged with the Australian company Santos.

History
Oil Search was founded in 1929. It was one of Papua New Guinea's largest companies, and in 2006 was responsible for 13% of Papua New Guinea's gross domestic product. It was publicly listed on the Port Moresby and Australian Stock Exchanges. It had a market capitalization of around US$12 billion.

A 17.6% interest in the company was held by the Government of Papua New Guinea, The company also operates areas in Yemen, Egypt, Libya, and the Kurdistan region of Iraq. In May 2014, ExxonMobil shipped the first cargo of liquefied natural gas (LNG) from the US$19 billion PNG LNG Project, in which Oil Search owns a 29% interest.

In 2021, Oil Search agreed terms with Santos to merge, with Oil Search shareholders taking a 38.5% shareholding in Santos. The merger took effect on 14 December 2021.

References

External links
Official site

Companies formerly listed on the Australian Securities Exchange
Dual-listed companies
Oil and gas companies of Papua New Guinea
1929 establishments in Papua New Guinea
Australian companies disestablished in 2021
Energy companies established in 1929
Non-renewable resource companies established in 1929
Energy companies disestablished in 2021
Non-renewable resource companies disestablished in 2021
2021 mergers and acquisitions